Pierre Krähenbühl (born 8 January 1966) is a Swiss national who has served as Commissioner General for the United Nations Relief and Works Agency for Palestine Refugees in the Near East (UNRWA) from March 2014 to November 2019. Before that, he served from July 2002 as Director of Operations at the International Committee of the Red Cross (ICRC).

On November 7, 2019 Pierre Krähenbühl, head of UNRWA resigned amid allegations of mismanagement; he claimed he was the victim of “dirty politics”. A subsequent internal UN investigation made public by the Swiss television channel RTS completely overturned most of these accusations.

Biography to 2002
Pierre Krähenbühl was born in Geneva, Switzerland. He lived for several years in Greece, Germany and Sweden as a child. He went to high school and university in his native country, and holds a B.A. in Political Science and International Relations from the University of Geneva and the Graduate Institute of International and Development Studies.

He became a communication assistant with the Lutheran World Federation (LWF) on assignment in Haiti a year after the fall of the Duvalier regime (1987). He worked extensively with labor unions and church base communities, as well as with civil-society activists engaged in improving conditions in their country.

During the years 1988–91, he returned to Haiti, but also travelled to several countries in Central America, as well as to Ethiopia, for further writing and film documentary production. The documentary, Haiti: A Forgotten Nation, which he co-directed with a Latin American journalist, was presented at several European and Latin American film festivals.

Krähenbühl started at the ICRC in late 1991 with an assignment in El Salvador, following the ending of the civil war there. He was then posted in Ayacucho, Peru (1992–93), working in the remote Andean regions, in villages bearing the brunt of the violent confrontation between the Shining Path and the Peruvian Armed Forces. The following two years saw him working in Afghanistan, first in Jalalabad (1993), then in Kabul (1994–95).

He next spent two and a half years in Bosnia and Herzegovina. first in Banja Luka, where he headed the ICRC's office during the upheavals of the final phase of the Bosnian conflict (July to November 1995), and later in Pale and Sarajevo during the first two years of the country's post-war recovery.

Krähenbühl was called back to ICRC headquarters in 1998 to oversee its work in the Balkans, including as head of a task force during the Kosovo conflict in 1999. From 2000 to 2002, he was personal adviser to the ICRC's then President, Jakob Kellenberger, before being appointed as Director of Operations in mid-2002.

Running ICRC
Krähenbühl oversaw the ICRC's response to the consequences of armed conflicts in Afghanistan, Iraq, Sudan, DR Congo, Libya, Somalia, Ivory Coast, Colombia and Syria, among other countries. He led senior-level negotiations with governments, armed forces and non-state armed groups in a number of regions, and engaged in dialogue on humanitarian priorities in the United States, China, Russia, Japan, Brazil, Australia, South Korea, Qatar, Saudi Arabia, Norway, the UK, France, Germany and Sweden, as well as with the UN, the EU, the OIC and other international bodies.

In addition to conducting the ICRC's traditionally discreet diplomacy, Krähenbühl spoke publicly about civilians affected by war in Afghanistan, Iraq, Colombia, Sri Lanka, and elsewhere. More controversially, he broke with ICRC tradition by making public comments about the Abu Ghraib torture and prisoner abuse in 2004.

Running UNRWA 
On 29 July 2019, Al Jazeera reported that an internal UNRWA report details alleged abuses of authority among the organization's senior management, including Krähenbühl. According to Al Jazeera, the internal report says that Krähenbühl and other UNRWA leaders pose "an enormous risk to the reputation of the UN" and that "their immediate removal should be carefully considered." Krähenbühl "unreservedly" rejected the characterization of UNRWA and its senior leadership and cited the ongoing investigation by the UN Office of Internal Oversight Services as preventing him from publicly responding to any allegations. On 6 November 2019, the UNRWA released a statement announcing that the UN's Office of Internal Oversight Services (OIOS) completed a part of its ongoing inquiry into UNRWA management-related matters, that its findings revealed management issues which related specifically to Krähenbühl, and that Krähenbühl 'has stepped aside until the completion of the process'. Krähenbühl then resigned.
According to the report from the Swiss radio television program Temps Present, the report of the UN internal investigation does only point to "few elements to charge" Krähenbühl who is appointed the high representative of the President of the ICRC in China in May 2021.

Personal life
Pierre Krähenbühl is married to Taiba Rahim, who is the President of the Nai-Qala Association, an organisation dedicated to health and education projects in Afghanistan. They have three sons, Bilal, Elias and Ilham.

References

External links
 Pierre Krähenbühl: Conflict, violence and delivering aid  on SlowTV

1966 births
Living people
Graduate Institute of International and Development Studies alumni
Red Cross personnel
Non-profit executives
UNRWA officials
Swiss officials of the United Nations
United Nations High Commissioners for Refugees
People from Geneva